A mantrap is a mechanical physical security device for catching poachers and trespassers. They have taken many forms, the most usual being like a large foothold trap, the steel springs being armed with teeth which meet in the victim's leg. Since 1827, they have been illegal in England, except in houses between sunset and sunrise as a defence against burglars.

Other traps such as special snares, trap netting, trapping pits, fluidizing solid matter traps and cage traps could be used.

Mantraps that use deadly force are illegal in the United States, and in notable tort law cases the trespasser has successfully sued the property owner for damages caused by the mantrap. There is also the possibility that such traps could endanger emergency service personnel such as firefighters who must forcefully enter such buildings during emergencies. As noted in the important American court case of Katko v. Briney, "the law has always placed a higher value upon human safety than upon mere rights of property".

See also
 Animal trapping 
 Mantrap (access control)
 Sally port
 Spring-gun
 Booby trap

References

External links

Area denial weapons
Hunting equipment